"Finding Judas" is the ninth episode of the third season of House and the fifty-fifth episode overall.

Plot
While at a carnival with her father, six-year-old Alice starts screaming hysterically. Each time the doctors perform a test on Alice, her skin reacts as if she has allergies to everything, even after they do surgery for gallstones. House suspects an infection and recommends broad-spectrum antibiotics, but Cuddy (elected guardian of the kid to decide best treatment when the divorced parents can't decide on anything) decides on Metronidazole. Alice keeps getting worse and Cuddy runs a charcoal hemoperfusion, during which Alice develops a clot in her arm. Foreman and Cuddy operate on her and remove the clot, during which time her temperature rises dangerously. With no ice packs in the room, Cuddy decides to take her into the shower, whereupon House berates her and says that it was good that she failed to be a mom, "because you suck at it."

House, on a controlled amount of pills rather than a free prescription due to Cuddy, concludes the kid has necrotizing fasciitis, and decides her only chance for survival is amputation of the infected limbs. Chase, playing with a laser pointer, realizes that Alice has erythropoietic protoporphyria (an allergy to lights that made her get worse everytime she was put under surgery), but House ignores the diagnosis and punches him in the face. House, embarrassed by his tantrum and lack of understanding, realizes that Chase is right.

After the surgery is stopped, Chase enters the doctors lounge, visibly stressed. Chase tells Wilson that he cannot stand the situation anymore, and that he's become impatient with waiting for House's approval and abruptly leaves the room. In the final scene, Wilson is shown visiting Tritter, who earlier had the accounts of Cameron and Foreman frozen temporarily in an attempt to try and get one of them to rat on him (Chase, however, had lied about having his accounts frozen). Wilson asks for his "thirty pieces of silver", a reference to the price for which Judas betrayed Jesus.

Awards
Lisa Edelstein and David Morse submitted this episode for consideration in their behalf in the categories of "Outstanding Supporting Actress in a Drama Series" and "Outstanding Guest Actor in a Drama Series" for the 2007 Emmy Awards.

References

External links
FOX.com-House official site
"House M.D." IMDB Profile

House (season 3) episodes
2006 American television episodes

fr:Rendez-vous avec Judas